genus of six species of lizards, endemic to Madagascar, commonly known as velvet geckos, and formerly considered part of the genus Homopholis.

Description
The species are generally similar, with small, conical scales on their dorsal surfaces, with overall dullish coloration, and a pattern of distinct transverse bands.

Species
The following six species are recognized.

 Blaesodactylus ambonihazo Bauer, Glaw, Gehring & Vences, 2011
 Blaesodactylus antongilensis (Böhme & Meier, 1980) 
 Blaesodactylus boivini (A.M.C. Duméril, 1856)
 Blaesodactylus microtuberculatus Jono, Brennan, Bauer & Glaw, 2015
 Blaesodactylus sakalava (Grandidier, 1867) 
 Blaesodactylus victori Iniech, Glaw & Vences, 2016

References

Further reading
Boettger O. 1893. Katalog der Reptilien-Sammlung im Museum der Senckenbergischen Naturforschenden Gesellschaft in Frankfurt am Main. I. Teil (Rhynchocephalen, Schildkröten, Krokodile, Eidechsen, Chamäleons). Frankfurt am Main: Gebrüder Knauer. x + 140 pp. (Blaesodactlus, new genus, p. 32).

External links

 
Lizard genera
Taxa named by Oskar Boettger